Progress M-25M, identified by NASA as Progress 57P, is a Progress spacecraft used by Roskosmos to resupply the International Space Station (ISS) during 2014. Progress M-25M was launched on a six-hours rendezvous profile towards the ISS. The 25th Progress-M 11F615A60 spacecraft to be launched, it had the serial number 425 and was built by RKK Energia.

Launch
The spacecraft was launched on 29 October 2014 at 07:09:43 UTC from the Baikonur Cosmodrome in Kazakhstan. This was the first time the upgraded Soyuz-2.1a rocket was used for an ISS mission launch.

Docking

Cargo
The Progress spacecraft carries 2351 kg of cargo and supplies to the International Space Station. The craft is delivering food, fuel and supplies, including 880 kg of propellant; 22 kg of oxygen; 26 kg of air; 420 kg of water; and 1283 kg of spare parts, supplies and experiment hardware for the six members of the Expedition 41 crew currently living and working in space. Progress M-25M is scheduled to remain docked to Pirs for six months.

See also

 2014 in spaceflight

References

External links

Progress (spacecraft) missions
Spacecraft launched in 2014
Spacecraft which reentered in 2015
2014 in Russia
Spacecraft launched by Soyuz-2 rockets
Supply vehicles for the International Space Station